The Kewaunee Post Office is located in Kewaunee, Wisconsin at 119 Ellis Street. The building was designed Louis A. Simon and built by Neal A. Melick. It is listed on the National Register of Historic Places. The building contains the mural "Winter Sports", painted by Paul Faulkner in 1940, and funded as part of the New Deal.

References

External links

Buildings and structures in Kewaunee County, Wisconsin
Post office buildings on the National Register of Historic Places in Wisconsin
National Register of Historic Places in Kewaunee County, Wisconsin